Carmen A. Piccone (August 19, 1929 – July 10, 2005) was an American football coach.  He served as the head football coach at Southern Illinois University Carbondale from 1959 to 1963 and at Trenton State College—now known as The College of New Jersey—from 1975 to 1976, compiling a career college football coaching record of 36–28–1.

Head coaching record

References

1929 births
2005 deaths
American football quarterbacks
Cornell Big Red football coaches
Southern Illinois Salukis football coaches
TCNJ Lions football coaches
Temple Owls football coaches
Temple Owls football players
VMI Keydets football coaches
Southern Illinois University alumni
Sportspeople from Philadelphia
Players of American football from Philadelphia
South Philadelphia High School alumni